Suraj: The Rising Star is an Indian animated television series presented by KODANSHA Inc., TMS Entertainment and DQ Entertainment.
     
It is based on the Japanese animated series Star of the Giants and it aired on Colors TV. This series premiered on 23 December 2012.

Voice cast
 Nachiket Dighe as Suraj

References

External links 

 

2012 Indian television series debuts
2013 Indian television series endings
Indian children's animated television series
Indian sports television series
Indian teen drama television series
Hindi-language television shows
Colors TV original programming
TMS Entertainment
Cricket on television
Television shows based on manga
Indian television series based on non-Indian television series
Animated sports television series